The following is a list of Bravia television products manufctured by Sony. In 2005 they discontinued their previous "WEGA LCD" line, and all Sony televisions are now known as Sony Bravia. Starting in 2013, the model year is encoded in a letter of the alphabet, so all 2015 models have a letter "C" in their name.

2005 models

2006 models

2007 models

2008 models

2009 models

2010 models

2011 models

2012 models

2013 models (A series)

2014 models (B series)

2015 models (C series)

2016 models (D series)

2017 models (D series & E series)

2018 models (F series)

2019 models (G series)

2020 models (H series)

2021 models (J Series)

2022 models (K Series)

References

Bravia